The China women's national rugby union team represents China internationally in rugby union. They played their first test match in 2006 and compete in the Asia Rugby Women's Championship and its divisional tournaments.

History

China played their first test match in 2006 against Thailand in the Asia Rugby Women's Championship. They were victorious with a 53–11 thrashing of Thailand. They eventually won the 2006 Asia Women's Championship. In 2007 they were runners-up after losing 34–5 to Kazakhstan in the final of the Asian Championship.

Record

(Full internationals only)

Full internationals

References

External links
 China on World Rugby.
 China  on rugbydata.com

Asian national women's rugby union teams
Women's national rugby union teams
Rugby union in China
China national rugby union team